Émile Auguste François Thomas Zurlinden (3 November 1837 in Colmar, Haut-Rhin – 9 March 1929) was French Minister of War between 28 January 1895 and 1 November 1895 and again between 5 September 1898 and 17 September 1898 when he succeeded Godefroy Cavaignac. A general, he was previously governor of Paris, and he accepted the vacant post of minister of war at the personal request of the president of the republic. According to Joseph Jacobs, "he was an honest soldier, but narrow-minded;" insults in the press "did not fail to affect him".

He was closely involved in the Resolution of the Dreyfus affair. His successor was Charles Chanoine. He was cross-eyed.

References

1837 births
1929 deaths
People from Colmar
Politicians from Grand Est
French Ministers of War
Politicians of the French Third Republic
Military governors of Paris
People associated with the Dreyfus affair
École Polytechnique alumni